Phaedrig Lucius Ambrose O'Brien, 17th Baron Inchiquin (4 April 1900 – 20 May 1982) was the holder of a hereditary peerage in the Peerage of Ireland, as well as Chief of the Name of O'Brien and Prince of Thomond in the Gaelic Irish nobility. He was a geologist.

Early life
Inchiquin was the third of five children born to Lucius O'Brien, 15th Baron Inchiquin and Ethel Jane O'Brien née Foster, daughter of Johnston Jonas Foster JP of Cliffe Hill, Lightcliffe. Inchiquin was educated at Eton College.

Career 
Inchiquin came of military age in 1918 and as such briefly served in Britain in World War I as a Gunner in the Royal Field Artillery, however, the conflict ended before he had served on active service or had been promoted.

Inchiquin then went on to study at and Magdalen College, Oxford where he graduated with an MA, and undertook further studies at the Imperial College London's Royal School of Mines, Inchiquin then went on to work in Kenya as a farmer and coffee planter from 1922 until 1936 when he was professionally engaged as a geologist in the mining industry by the Anglo-American Corporation of South Africa.

Inchiquin left Africa in 1939 to serve in World War II. He was commissioned in 1940 as Second Lieutenant into the Rifle Brigade. Inchiquin was subsequently attached to the East African Intelligence Corps in Somaliland, Ethiopia and Madagascar and was mentioned in despatches in 1941, as well as wounded. Inchiquin rose to the rank of Major in 1943 and was finally demobilised in 1946.

After demobilisation he returned to the Anglo-American Corporation of South Africa and worked for the company until he entered the British Colonial Service in 1954. He was employed on survey to the government of Northern Rhodesia(now Zambia), as senior geologist, becoming assistant director in 1957. He retired from the Colonial Service in 1959 but continued to work as a consultant geologist until 1967 and succeed to the Baron Inchiquin peerage in 1968.

Family 
Inchiquin was the younger brother of Donough O'Brien, 16th Baron Inchiquin, whom he inherited the Baron Inchiquin peerage from upon his death as he had no male issue. He was also the uncle of the current incumbent of the Baron Inchiquin title, Conor O'Brien, 18th Baron Inchiquin.

On 19 February 1945 he married Vera Maud Winter, the daughter of Reverend Clifton Winter of Winton House in Dawlish. They had no issue.

After succeeding to his brother's peerage, he returned to Ireland where he maintained Thomond House on the former ancestral estate of Dromoland Castle. The 16th Baron had sold most of the estate including the ancestral seat to billionaire industrialist Bernard McDonough in 1962 and had subsequently built the adjacent Thomond House. Today the Castle remains intact and serves as a luxury hotel. It is now owned by a series of Irish-American businessmen. Inchiquin also maintained a smaller home in England at Richard's Castle near Ludlow.

Inchiquin died on 20 May 1982 in Richards Castle and was succeeded by his nephew Conor now the 18th Baron Inchiquin.

References

20th-century British geologists
1982 deaths
People educated at Eton College
People from County Clare
Phaedrig
1900 births
Barons Inchiquin
British Army personnel of World War I
Royal Field Artillery soldiers
British Army personnel of World War II
Rifle Brigade officers
Irish chiefs of the name